Public Domain are a British electronic music group, whose music includes acid and hard techno elements. They had their biggest hit towards the end of 2000, "Operation Blade (Bass in the Place)", which peaked at No. 5 on the UK Singles Chart and the top 10 in Australia, Austria, Germany and Norway. It sold one million copies internationally. In 2001, they released their only album, Hard Hop Superstars.

The original line-up of the group featured James Allan, Mark Sherry and Alistair MacIsaac. Mallorca Lee and David Forbes were added to the group before their chart breakthrough. In 2002, after two further top 40 singles in the form of "Rock da Funky Beats" (No. 19) and "Too Many MCs" (No. 34), Lee and Forbes both left, and MacIsaac followed them. Neil Skinner joined the line-up.

Discography

Albums

Singles

Notes

References

Scottish electronic music groups